DJ Woody (born 1977-) is a prolific DJ and turntablist born in Burnley, Lancashire UK.

Career
Started DJing in 1992 but made his name through the dj competition circuit when in 2001 when he was the first European DJ to win the ITF (International Turntablist Federation) World championship title in San Francisco, a year later he won the Vestax World title.

He is known for his innovative and musical approach to turntablism and is responsible for the invention of various scratches and techniques including his famous signature Woodpecker Scratch.

He helped Vestax (turntable and mixer manufacturer) in the design of their Controller One turntable, the first ever turntable to play full musical scales.

In 2002 Woody toured the United States with Stones Throw Records' artists Lootpack (Madlib, Wildchild & DJ Romes), Declaime, J Sands (Lone Catalist) and P Trix (US DMC Champion) and DJ Dopey (World Disco Mix Club Champion)

The following year he joined the 'Russian Percussion' touring outfit alongside producer DJ Vadim and vocalists Blu Rum 13 and Yarah Bravo. This touring outfit later formed hip hop collective One Self.
Their LP Children of Possibility was released in 2005 on Ninja Tune Records.
The group were described by The Times as "best newcomers of 2005" and won Channel 4's Slashmusic Showcase.

Mixes released in this period were UK hip hop retrospective "Bangers & Mash" and crate-digging collaboration with Sean Canty (Demdike Stare) A Country Practice, both received widespread acclaim in the music press.

Between 2007 and 2009 DJ Woody was tour DJ for Latin Grammy winner Mala Rodriguez (Universal Records).

In 2010 Woody launch his ground breaking audio-visual DJ show 'Turntables in Technicolor'. 
Drawing on his former career as a graphic designer he also designed and animated all the material used in the show.
Notable performances of this set were at the 2010 World DMC Finals in London and 2011 US DMC finals in New York, a support slot for The Happy Mondays and a bespoke performance for the BBC's hit kids TV show The Slammer. 
In 2011 Woodys video remix featuring Hollywood star Anne Hathaway was discussed, blogged and tweeted Worldwide by the likes of BBC Newbeat, Scott Mills, Tommy Lee (Mötley Crüe), NME and Glamour Magazine. Hathaway passed comment on the video at London's 'One Day' movie premier.

In 2012 Woody released a mixtape with prominent UK rapper Dr Syntax, and a DJ mix for Tokyo Dawn Records. The latter achieving "Mix of the Week' on both MTV and Okayplayer (The Roots) websites.
In 2012 his themed video DJ set 'DJ Woody's Big Phat 90s' was described as 'mind-blowing' by veteran DJ and writer Billy Jam in his feature for Amoeba Records. In 2013 Woody started touring his audio-visual hip hop retrospective 'Hip Hop is 40'.

In 2015 Woody took audio-visual-turntablism to the theatre, premiering 'Blake Remixed' at the 2015 Edinburgh
Fringe and touring UK theatres. In this collaboration with beatboxer and rapper Testament, Woody created a live soundtrack via the turntables
whilst controlling interactive 3d projection mapped characters, enabling the DJ turntables to become part of the storytelling.

In 2016 Woody's production came to the fore. Firstly in the form of 'BocaWoody' a new collaborative project with Bristols Boca45, the pair released a 6 track EP and vinyl 7" in May. In October Woody released his debut solo LP 'The Point Of Contact’. The album features musicians Christian Madden (keyboard player for Liam Gallagher), Carl Sharrocks (drummer for 808 State), Nick Blacka (Gogo Penguin) and Matthew Halsall (Wondwana Records). The live act, in which Woody utilises the turntables as a lead instrument includes drums (Sharrocks) and keyboards (Madden) and debuted at the DMC World Finals at the 02 Kentish Town Forum in London.

May 2017 saw the release of the full-length album “Carousel” from BocaWoody. Described as “Super feel-good funky hip hop exuburance!” by Cold Cut's
Jon Moore, the single ‘Jump’ featuring BluRum13 made BBC Radio 6 music Recommends playlist.

In 2018 and 2019 Woody was the support act for 'Hacienda Classical' for arena tours with Peter
Hook, Mike Pickering, Graham Park and the Manchester Camerata Orchestra. These concluding each year with performances at the Royal Albert Hall.

Awards
2001 Northern DMC Champion
2001 UK ITF Champion
2001 UK Vestax Champion
2001 World ITF Champion
2002 DMC UK Defending Champion
2002 UK Vestax Champion
2002 World Vestax Champion

Appearances
Krispy formally Krispy 3 – Millennium Funk (Damn Right)
Indiginus – Homebaked LP (Kinky Star Records)
Geist – Rage/Cut Throat 12" (Geistweb)
DJ Vadim – Headline News 12 (Ninja Tune)
Sirconical – Waving at Planes (Twisted Nerve)
Evil Ed – The Enthusiast LP (Janomi)
One Self – Be Your Own 12 (Ninja Tune)
One Self – Blue Bird/Fear the Labour 12 (Ninja Tune)
Gangstarr Foundation (Guru & Krumbsnatcha)- Ahead of the Game
One Self – Children of Possibility LP (Ninja Tune)
One Self – Paranoid 12" (Ninjatune)
DJ Vadim – Soundcatcher LP (B.B.E)
I-DEF-I – In The Light of a New Day (Copro)
Dirt Diggers – The Pleasure Is All Mine (Zebra Traffic)
DJ Grasshoppa – Intricate Moves 2 LP
K Delight – scratch club
DJ Vadim – Got to Rock 12" (BBE)
Aquasky – Breakbeat Bass 4 mix CD (Passenger)
IDA World Final track feat Ragga Twins, DJ Rafik, DJ Woody, DJ Pfel Mpran
Seek Tha Northerner – Warning (Killamari)
Blu Rum 13 – Inverted LP
Aquasky – The Hip Hop EP (Passenger)
Mala Rodriguez & The Original Jazz Orchestra – Tengo Un Trato
Gunshot – Burn Cycle

Releases

DJ Woody – Fly Fishing (Chopped Herring Records)
The Boogie (DJ Woody Mixtape) – Tokyo Dawn Records
DJ Woody Vs Body Snatchers – Passenger Mixtape Vol.1 (Passenger)
Dj Vadim & Dj Woody – Lettuce Propelled Rockets (JFR)
DJ Woody & Sean Vinylment – A Country Practice (Woodwurk)
Dj Vadim & Dj Woody – Lettuce Propelled Rockets (JFR)
DJ Woody – Bangers & Mash (Woodwurk)
DJ Woody – Flexicuts (Woodwurk)
DJ Woody – Flexicuts 2 (Woodwurk)
DJ Woody – Flexicuts 3 (Woodwurk)
DJ Woody – Flexicuts 4 (Woodwurk)
DJ Woody – Flexicuts 5 (Woodwurk)
DJ Woody – Flexicuts 6 (Woodwurk)
DJ Woody – Flexin Hard LP (Woodwurk)
DJ Woody – Flexin Hard 2 LP (Woodwurk)
DJ Woody – Ear Wax 7" (Woodwurk)
DJ Woody – Repetitive Scratch Injury 7" (Woodwurk)
DJ Woody – The Point Of Contact LP (Woodwurk)
DJ Woody – The Point Of Contact Stems & Scratches 7"(Woodwurk)
DJ Woody – Scratch Sounds No.1 LP (Woodwurk)
DJ Woody – Scratch Sounds No.1 7" (Woodwurk)
DJ Woody – Scratch Sounds No.2 LP (Woodwurk)
DJ Woody – Scratch Sounds No.2 7" (Woodwurk)
BocaWoody (DJ Woody & Boca 45) - NW/SW EP (BocaWoody Recordings)
BocaWoody (DJ Woody & Boca 45) - Jump 7" (BocaWoody Recordings)
BocaWoody (DJ Woody & Boca 45) - Freeze 7" (BocaWoody Recordings)
BocaWoody (DJ Woody & Boca 45) - Carousel LP (BocaWoody Recordings)

References

Notes
Vestax endorsement
Serato Scratch Live endorsement

External links
 Official website
 Video interview
 Online interview
 BBC interview

1977 births
British hip hop DJs
English hip hop musicians
Living people
People from Burnley